Padhavi Paduthum Paadu is a 2005 Tamil language political satire film directed by C. Ramalingam. The film stars Ranjith and Anamika, with Ravichandran, Pyramid Natarajan, Manivannan, Vasu Vikram, Rajesh, Raj Kapoor, T. P. Gajendran, Alex and Pandu playing supporting roles. The film was produced by G. Moorthy, its musical score, by Gandhidasan and it was released on 3 June 2005.

Plot

Malayappan (Ranjith) is a notorious brigand, living in the forest, who kidnaps the former Chief Minister Tamizharasan (Ravichandran) and demands a huge ransom to the government. The current Chief Minister Veerabhadran (Pyramid Natarajan) in any case is glad that his arch-political rival and leader of the opposition has been kidnapped by Malayappan. Veerabhadran declares to the media that he will not negotiate with Malayappan and he will not give a single penny to the brigand. Malayappan realizes that he made a mistake by kidnapping the wrong person. Therefore, the cunning Tamizharasan suggests that Malayappan kidnap Veerabhadran's daughter and Malayappan follows his advice. Veerabhadran, who now wants to save his daughter at any cost, sends the popular news reporter Muthuvel (Vasu Vikram) to negotiate with the brigand in the forest. Thereafter, Malayappan releases Veerabhadran's daughter and a video of him killing Tamizharasan.

Following the fiasco, the governor of Tamil Nadu dismissed the current state government and Veerabhadran lost his Chief Minister post. Malayappan even gets a general amnesty and receives a government bungalow. Tamizharasan is indeed alive and that video of him being killed was a sham. Malayappan, who was hiding in the forests so far, is hailed by the people of Tamil Nadu. Thus Malayappan forms a political party after seeing his growing popularity. According to the survey, Malayappan has a good probability to become the new Chief Minister. Veerabhadran and Tamizharasan's party members then join Malayappan's party. In the end, the brigand cum politician Malayappan wins the election by a huge margin and becomes the new Chief Minister. In the meantime, Malayappan marries his lover Ponni (Anamika). Unlike the former Chief Ministers, Malayappan wants to help the people and starts his fight against corruption. What transpires next forms the crux of the story.

Cast

Ranjith as Malayappan 
Anamika as Ponni
Ravichandran as Tamizharasan 
Pyramid Natarajan as Veerabhadran
Manivannan as Marudhanayagam
Vasu Vikram as Muthuvel
Rajesh as Manivasagam
Raj Kapoor as Raja
T. P. Gajendran
Alex
Pandu
Auditor Sridhar as Seetharaman
Nellai Siva
Sempuli Jagan as Sengali
Chelladurai as Swamy
Tirupur Ramasamy
Nambirajan
Abhinayashree

Production
C. Ramalingam, a one-time associate of director K. Bhagyaraj, made his directorial debut with Padhavi Paduthum Paadu. He said, "though it is about Veerappan, it's no serious stuff. It's a political spoof certain to draw humour in the theatre". The movie was shot in Chennai, Tiruvannamalai, Sathyamangalam and Anthiyur forest areas where the brigand Veerappan lived.

Soundtrack

The film score and the soundtrack were composed by Gandhidasan. The soundtrack, released in 2005, features 4 tracks with lyrics written by P. Vijay and Kabilan.

Reception
The film received negative reviews from critics with a critic stating, "it turns out to be a good political satire that lays bare the politics of the land. It just doesn't realise that too much of a good thing can end up being bad too. Some judicious editing and better marketing might have improved its fortunes at the box-office". Malathi Rangarajan of The Hindu wrote, "Veerappan would probably do a somersault in his grave if he sees himself portrayed as a gullible nincompoop on the one hand and an honest Minister on the other. And all these without an iota of finesse". Sify said, " a disappointing venture as screenplay and direction goes haywire as the dialogue writer and director does far too much political pontification" and labelled the film as avoidable. Indiaglitz wrote, "that is tantamount to practising for the Olympics marathon by jogging in the park. Satire needs punch and power. But that is sadly missing in this. Padhavi Paduthum Paadu, in that sense, misses the wood for trees".

References

2005 films
2000s Tamil-language films
2000s political comedy films
Indian political comedy films
Indian political satire films
Films shot in Chennai
Films set in forests
2005 directorial debut films